Kev Alexander Coghlan (born 23 June 1988) is a British motorcycle racer. He has won the European Junior Supersport title in 2008 and the Spanish CEV Supersport Championship and the European Supersport title in 2009; he has also ridden in the 125cc and Moto2 World Championships, the Supersport World Championship and the FIM Superstock 1000 Cup.

Career

In 2012 Coghlan split his program into British Supersport Championship aboard a Yamaha and the FIM Superstock 1000 Cup aboard a Ducati, due to the struggles of travelling too and from Britain and Europe Coghlan quit the British Supersport Championship to concentrate on the Superstock 1000 championship, this led to a vast improvement in his results scoring his first podium (2nd place) at Nürburgring and going on to finish 9th in the championship as well as ending up 17th in the British Supersport Championship.

Career statistics

Grand Prix motorcycle racing

By season

Races by year
(key)

Supersport World Championship
(key) (Races in bold indicate pole position) (Races in italics indicate fastest lap)

British Supersport Championship

Notes

1. – Race was abandoned after second restart, half points awarded.

References

External links

125cc World Championship riders
Moto2 World Championship riders
British motorcycle racers
1988 births
Living people
Supersport World Championship riders
FIM Superstock 1000 Cup riders